(E)-γ-bisabolene synthase (EC 4.2.3.59) is an enzyme with systematic name (2E,6E)-farnesyl-diphosphate diphosphate-lyase ((E)-γ-bisabolene-forming). This enzyme catalyses the following chemical reaction

 (2E,6E)-farnesyl diphosphate  (E)-γ-bisabolene + diphosphate

References

External links 
 

EC 4.2.3